Somerfield was a UK supermarket chain.

Somerfield may also refer to:
 Somerfield, New Zealand, a suburb of Christchurch
 Alf Somerfield (1918–1885), English footballer
 Stafford Somerfield (1911–1995), British newspaper editor
 , a Union ship in the American Civil War
 Somerfield, Pennsylvania, a ghost town under the waters of Youghiogheny River Lake

See also
 Summerfield (disambiguation)